Sairam Iyer is an Indian singer, based in Mumbai, India.

Career
Sairam Iyer was influenced by Lata Mangeshkar and Asha Bhosle.
Sairam has been complimented for his dual voice singing ability by music directors in the Hindi film world, such as Naushad, Laxmikant Pyarelal and Kalyanji Anandji (for whose "Little Wonders" Sairam has sung on various occasions). Anil Biswas referred to Sairam as the "Eighth Wonder of the World".

Iyer has many albums and solo songs to his credit including “Aisa Bhi Kabhi Hota Hai” (a Solo Duet Album by BMC Crescendo), “Ye Ishq Ke Taur Tareeke”, “Umeed”, and many more hit songs featured in the YouTube channel “Sufiscore”.

Iyer has trained under many musical greats including the late Pandit Ramesh Nadkarni, Ghazal maestro late Mohan Khan Sab, Music composer late Shri Achyut Thakur, Sarangi Maestro late Shri Dhruba Ghosh. 

Iyer has won many awards at various competitions of different levels (college, university, zonal and national). He participated in the Mumbai University's music choir under the choir conductor Late Kanu Ghosh and, subsequently, was chosen to conduct the choir by Shri Ghosh. 

Iyer has done social service and charity work for various causes including aid for earthquake victims,  tsunami hit areas and flood victims. He is also involved in a lot of social service activities including Old age homes, Orphanages, Cancer hospitals and Hospices, Home for Blind, Autistic and the Differently Abled.

Albums
As "Sairam and Sairam", BMG Crescendo released a romantic music album, Aisa Bhi Kabhi Hota Hai, containing two duets, two female solos and two male solos.
Shaila Music, in alliance with Mantram Records, released a 5-CD package entitled The Mantram Collection or "Telephone to Heaven", a collection of sound vibrations performed by artists. All musical arrangements and keyboard instrumentation are by Swamini Turiyasangitananda Alice Coltrane. All of the singers are from Sai Anantam Ashram, with the exception of the two lead vocalists from India. The male lead singer is Sairam Iyer and the female vocalist is Sandhya Sanjana.

References

Year of birth missing (living people)
Living people
Indian male singers
Singers from Mumbai
Place of birth missing (living people)